Diane Redmond is a British author and dramatist. She became interested in children's literature while teaching English in Italy. Redmond returned to England where she continued teaching. She also became a radio and TV presenter.

Redmond is a prolific writer for children, having authored the Joshua Cross series of historical adventure stories. Redmond has also written for the stage, radio and television.

References

British children's writers
British dramatists and playwrights
English schoolteachers
Living people
Year of birth missing (living people)
British women screenwriters
British women children's writers
British women dramatists and playwrights